Joseph B. Sagal (born February 12, 1957) is an American actor and  screenwriter. He is the son of film director Boris Sagal.

Career highlights include, He originated the part of "The Visitor" on the Geffen Playhouse stage in the World Premiere Steppenwolf Production of the initial 357 performances of Steve Martin's Picasso at the Lapin Agile. This production was the Los Angeles debut of Chicago's Steppenwolf Theatre Company.   Played the D.C. Comics Villain, Gunn, in the D.C. Comics movie “Return of the Swampthing”. Wrote the screenplay for, acted in and executive produced the film Elvis & Nixon. The first film officially acquired  by Amazon. Sagal met Elvis on the set of his father's 1965 film Girl Happy, which eventually inspired him to take the role of Elvis "The Visitor" in Steve Martin's play “Picasso at the Lapin Agile” and write  the screenplay for Elvis & Nixon. Played Elvis again for legendary writer Stephen King in his mini-series, “Nightmares and Dreamscapes”,  in King's Rock n Roll story, “You Know They Got a Hell of a Band”, Sagal played the Mayor of Rock n Roll heaven Elvis Presley. Shot in Australia. “Not Another Celebrity Movie” a spoof of Oceans 11, playing George Clooney. Played the Elvis Impersonator Announcer in the movie “Redline” a Fast n Furious type movie with high end cars.         Played “Elvis Presley the Vampire Hunter” on the SyFi channel in the series  “The Chronicle” episode “ The King is Undead”.           Did two movies for New Line Cinema “Quiet Cool” playing the stoner Toker, and “The Hidden” playing the Drunk. Sagal's father, Boris Sagal, was a Ukrainian-Jewish immigrant who worked as a television director.

Filmography

References

External links
 

1957 births
Living people
American male actors
American people of Ukrainian-Jewish descent